The year 2010  in art involves some significant events.

Events
February 3 – The sculpture L'Homme qui marche I by Alberto Giacometti sells in London for £65 million, at this time a new world record for a work of art sold at auction.
February–March – Artist Michael Landy hosts the Art Bin.
March – Lawrence Salander, the former proprietor of the now closed Salander/O'Reilly Galleries pleads guilty to 29 felony counts of grand larceny and in August is sentenced to six to eighteen years in prison.
March 3 – The New Museum in New York sparks controversy with Skin Fruit: Selections from the Dakis Joannou Collection by deciding to exhibit works from the private collection of one of its trustees.
May – MAXXI the new and first Italian national museum of contemporary art designed by architect Zaha Hadid opens in Rome.
May 4 – Nude, Green Leaves and Bust a 1932 painting by Pablo Picasso is sold at Christie's for $106.5 million. There are more than half a dozen bidders, while the winning bid is taken via telephone.
May 20 – Five paintings including works by Picasso and Matisse worth €100 million are stolen from the Musée d'Art Moderne de la Ville de Paris.
June 9 – American Cable television Bravo premieres a new series Work of Art: The Next Great Artist. Produced by Sarah Jessica Parker, judges included Jerry Saltz, China Chow Jeanne Greenberg Rohatyn, Bill Powers, and Simon de Pury.
June 16 – The Royal Cornwall Museum in England sells two Victorian paintings (Herbert James Draper's The Sea Maiden and Ernest Normand's Bondage) at Christie's to help secure its finances.
August – Launch of John Moores Painting Prize China.
October – Ai Weiwei's Sunflower Seeds (painted porcelain) installed in Tate Modern's Turbine Hall.
December 6 – Museo del Novecento (Museum of Twentieth Century), dedicated to Italian Art of the Twentieth Century, with a small collection of other related European art opens in Milan.

Exhibitions
January 20 until April 18 – The Drawings of Bronzino at the Metropolitan Museum of Art in New York City.
March 14 until May 31 – Marina Abramović, "The Artist is Present" at MoMA in New York City.
"Matisse: Radical Invention 1913–1917" at The Art Institute of Chicago (March 20 – June 20) and MoMA, New York (July 18 – October 11), curated by Stephanie D'Alessandro and John Elderfield.
September 24 until January 11, 2011 –  Bronzino Artist and Poet at the Court of The Medici in Florence, Italy.
October 20 until January 30, 2011 – "David Hockney: Fleurs Fraiches (Fresh Flowers)" at the Foundation Pierre Bergé—Yves Saint Laurent in Paris, curated by Charlie Scheips.
December 19 until March 21, 2011 – "Andy Warhol: Motion Pictures" at MoMA in New York City.

Works

 David Annand - Rory Gallagher (sculpture)
 Sebastien Boyesen – Guardian (sculpture)
Maurizio Cattelan – "L.O.V.E" (sculpture)
 Olafur Eliasson – Colour Activity House (21st Century Museum of Contemporary Art, Kanazawa, Japan)
 Katharina Fritsch – Hahn/Cock (sculpture)
 Rodney Graham – Aerodynamic Forms in Space (sculpture, Vancouver, British Columbia)
 Anthea Hamilton – Brick Suit (sculpture) 
 Teresa Margolles – Muro Ciudad Juárez (instillation/sculpture) 
 Jonathan Meese – Die Humpty-Dumpty-Maschine der totalen Zukunft (sculpture)
 Julie Mehretu – Mural at Goldman Sachs Headquarters in New York City
 Wilhelm Sasnal – Anka
 Stik – A Couple Hold Hands in the Street (graffiti, East End of London)
 Henry Ward – The 'Finger-Assisted' Nephrectomy of Professor Nadey Hakim
 Cajsa von Zeipel - Seconds in Ecstasy  (sculpture, Gothenburg Museum of Art, Gothenburg, Sweden)
 Zhang Huan – Hehe Xiexie (sculpture, Shanghai, China)

Awards
Archibald Prize – Sam Leach for "Tim Minchin"
Artes Mundi Prize – Yael Bartana
Bucksbaum Award – Michael Asher,
Henry Hope Reed Award for classical art and design – Vincent Scully
John Moores Painting Prize – Keith Coventry for "Spectrum Jesus"

Deaths
January 5 – Kenneth Noland, 85, American Color Field painter
January 20 – Calvin Maglinger, 85, American painter
January 27 – Eduardo Michaelsen, 89, Cuban exile Naive painter
January 30
Lucienne Day, 93, British textile designer
Ursula Mommens, 101, British potter
February 25 – Ernst Beyeler, 88, Swiss art dealer and collector
March 1 – Ruth Kligman, 80, American painter, known as the muse of several important American artists of the mid 20th century notably Jackson Pollock, and Willem de Kooning, and only survivor of Jackson Polllock's fatal car accident
March 26 – Charles Ryskamp, American art collector and former director of The Frick Collection and The Morgan Library & Museum
March 15 – Elaine Hamilton, American painter
April 6 – Hans Schröder, 78, German sculptor and painter
April 20
Robert Natkin, 79, American Abstract painter
Purvis Young, 67, American Abstract artist
April 21 – Deborah Remington, 79, American Abstract artist
April 24 – Giuseppe Panza, 87, Italian art collector
April 29 – Avigdor Arikha, 80, Israeli painter, printmaker, and art historian
May 9 – Craig Kauffman, 78, American Abstract artist
May 18 – Shusaku Arakawa, 73, Japanese painter, conceptual artist and architect
May 29 – Dennis Hopper, 74, American actor and visual artist
May 30 – Lester Johnson, 91, American painter
May 31 – Louise Bourgeois, 98, French-born American sculptor, artist
June 3 – John Hedgecoe, 78, English photographer and author 
June 6 – Paul Wunderlich, 83, German painter, sculptor and graphic artist
June 7 – Omar Rayo, 82, Colombian painter and sculptor 
June 10 – Sigmar Polke, 69, German painter and photographer
June 19 – Paul Thiebaud, 49, American gallerist, art dealer
June 29 – Doug Ohlson, 73, American painter
July 1 – Arnold Friberg, 96, American painter
July 15 – Nicolas Carone, 93, American painter
September 4 – Paul Conrad, 86, American political cartoonist and sculptor
September 14 – Ralph T. Coe, 81, American art museum director (Nelson-Atkins Museum of Art)
September 23 – Stephen Pace, 91, American painter
October 2 – Robert Goodnough, 92, American painter
October 8 – Karl Prantl, 86, Austrian sculptor
October 24 – Sylvia Sleigh, 94 American painter
November 8 – Jack Levine, 95, American Social realist painter
November 14 – Nathan Oliveira, 81, American painter
November 23 – Nassos Daphnis, 96, American painter
December 17 – Captain Beefheart, 69, American musician and visual artist
December 24 – John Warhola, 85, American museum founder (The Andy Warhol Museum) and brother of Andy Warhol

References

 
 
2010s in art
Years of the 21st century in art